The Atlas LV-3B, Atlas D Mercury Launch Vehicle or Mercury-Atlas Launch Vehicle, was a human-rated expendable launch system used as part of the United States Project Mercury to send astronauts into low Earth orbit. Manufactured by American aircraft manufacturing company Convair, it was derived from the SM-65D Atlas missile, and was a member of the Atlas family of rockets.

The Atlas D missile was the natural choice for Project Mercury since it was the only launch vehicle in the US arsenal that could put the spacecraft into orbit and also had many flights from which to gather data. But its reliability was far from perfect, and Atlas launches ending in explosions were an all-too common sight at Cape Canaveral. The Atlas had also been originally designed as a weapon system, thus its design and reliability did not need to necessarily be 100% perfect. As such, significant steps had to be taken to human-rate the missile and make it safe and reliable unless NASA wished to spend several years developing a dedicated launch vehicle for crewed programs or else wait for the next-generation Titan II ICBM to become operational. Atlas' stage-and-a-half configuration was seen as preferable to the two stage Titan in that all engines were ignited at liftoff, making it easier to test for hardware problems during pre-launch checks.

Shortly after being chosen for the program in early 1959, the Mercury astronauts were taken to watch the second D-series Atlas test, which exploded a minute into launch. This was the fifth straight complete or partial Atlas failure and the booster was at this point nowhere near reliable enough to carry a nuclear warhead or an uncrewed satellite, let alone a human passenger. Plans to human-rate Atlas were effectively still on the drawing board and Convair estimated that 75% reliability would be achieved by early 1961 and 85% reliability by the end of the year. Despite the Atlas' developmental problems, NASA had the benefit of conducting Project Mercury simultaneously with the Atlas R&D program which gave plenty of test flights to draw data from as well as test modified equipment for Mercury.

Launch outcomes

Launch History

See also 

 Project Mercury

Notes

References 

Atlas LV3B